Paracardiophorus is a genus of beetles belonging to the family Elateridae.

The species of this genus are found in Europe, Japan, Australia and Northern America.

Species:
 Paracardiophorus carduelis (Candeze, 1865)

References

Elateridae
Elateridae genera